Kelly Mann may refer to:

 Kelly Mann (baseball) (born 1967), former baseball catcher
 Kelly Mann (special effects artist), film special effects practitioner and make-up artist
 Kelly Mann (sports administrator) (born 1958), BC Games Society President and CEO